Peter Lang is an academic publisher specializing in the humanities and social sciences. It has its headquarters in Pieterlen and Bern, Switzerland, with offices in Brussels, Frankfurt am Main, New York City, Dublin, Oxford, Vienna, and Warsaw.

Peter Lang publishes over 1,800 academic titles annually, both in print and digital formats, with a backlist of over 55,000 books. It has its complete online journals collection available on Ingentaconnect, and distributes its digital textbooks globally through Kortext.

Areas of publication 
The company specializes in the following twelve subject areas:

History
The company was founded in Frankfurt am Main in 1970 by Swiss editor Peter Lang. Since 1982 it has an American subsidiary, Peter Lang Publishing USA, specializing in textbooks for classroom use in education, media and communication, and Black studies, as well as monographs in the humanities and social sciences.

Academic journals
Peter Lang publishers 23 academic journals.

References

External links 
 

Publishing companies established in 1970
Academic publishing companies
Publishing companies of Switzerland
Companies based in Bern
Mass media in Bern